Giulio Masetti (1895 – 25 April 1926) was an Italian nobleman and racing driver, known as "the lion of Madonie" from his dominating the Targa Florio in the early 1920s.

Born in Vinci, he was the older brother of the racing driver Conte Carlo Masetti, both living in
Castello di Uzzano, a palace in Greve in Chianti owned by the Masetti di Bagnano family since 1644.

Masetti acquired his first car, a 4.5-litre Fiat S57 B14 from Antonio Ascari, in which he was fourth at X Targa Florio (1919), and won the XII Targa Florio (1921). The next year, he won XIII Targa Florio in his privately entered ex-Otto Salzer 1914 Mercedes 4.5-litre 115 HP 18/100 (1922).
Masetti then raced an Alfa Romeo RL TF (second at XIV Targa Florio, 1924) before joining the Sunbeam-Talbot-Darracq team. He was third in a Sunbeam 135 bhp 2-litre at the 1925 French Grand Prix, but failed to finish the San Sebastián Grand Prix (1925) and the II Rome Grand Prix (1926).

He died at  Sclafani Bagni, Sicily, during the XVII Targa Florio, while driving entry #13, a Delage 2L CV. A stone plaque is erected at the place. Since this incident, the entry #13 is no longer issued at Grand Prix events.

References 

1895 births
1926 deaths
People from Vinci, Tuscany
Sportspeople from the Metropolitan City of Florence
Italian racing drivers
Grand Prix drivers
Racing drivers who died while racing
Sport deaths in Italy